Diamond Point Airport is a private community airport located on the northeast corner of Miller Peninsula in Clallam County, Washington,  east of Sequim. It opened in August 1965.

Traffic pattern is to the north over the water. Runway lighting is on from dusk to dawn. Deer on the runway are common.

See 2WA1.org for airport information, procedures, and photos.

References

External links
 Diamond Point Airport

Airports in Washington (state)
Transportation buildings and structures in Clallam County, Washington